WOAK is a Christian radio station licensed to LaGrange, Georgia, broadcasting on 90.9 MHz FM.  The station is owned by Oakside Christian School.

WOAK's programming includes Christian music and Christian talk and teaching. Christian talk and teaching programs on WOAK includes: Thru the Bible with J. Vernon McGee, Revive Our Hearts with Nancy DeMoss Wolgemuth, In Touch with Dr. Charles Stanley, The Family Altar Program with Lester Roloff, Love Worth Finding with Adrian Rogers, Turning Point with David Jeremiah, and Adventures in Odyssey.

References

External links
WOAK's official website

Radio stations established in 1984
1984 establishments in Georgia (U.S. state)
OAK